Michael John Trout (born 21 November 1963) is an Australian Liberal National politician who was the member of the Legislative Assembly of Queensland for Barron River from 2012 to 2015, having won the seat at the 2012 state election.

References

Liberal National Party of Queensland politicians
1963 births
Living people
Members of the Queensland Legislative Assembly
21st-century Australian politicians